2/11 may refer to:

February 11 (month-day date notation)
November 2 (day-month date notation)
February 11 AD (month-year date notation)
2 AD November (year-month date notation)
2nd Battalion, 11th Marines, an artillery battalion of the United States Marine Corps

See also

 11 (disambiguation)
 2 (disambiguation)

 211 (disambiguation)
 11/2 (disambiguation) 
 112 (disambiguation)